House of CB is a women's fashion retailer founded by British Conna Walker in 2010, and known for its figure-hugging clothing. House of CB is known for its form-fitting and tailored pieces, producing designer-inspired party clothing.

History
The brand was founded by a then 17 year old, Conna Walker from her bedroom, with a £3,000 loan from her father. The brand includes a full collection of womenswear that also covers lingerie, swimwear, shoes, and accessories. In 2016 Walker introduced House of CB's younger sister brand, Mistress Rocks. House of CB garments have been worn by Hollywood celebrities, such as Beyoncé, Gigi Hadid, Lady Gaga, Jennifer Lopez, and the Kardashians.

In 2020, House of CB launched their bridal collection.

References

External links

Official Website
Wedding Dresses

Clothing retailers of Australia
Clothing retailers of the United Kingdom
Retail companies established in 2010
Wedding dress designers